Vigneshwara Maha Vidyalaya is a school in Trincomalee, founded in 1823 as a primary school by the Methodist church. It was upgraded to a Maha Vidiyalayam in 1979 and 1C grade school in 1981. Vikneshwara Maha Vidyalaya is located on the main street of the town of Trincomalee.

Former Methodist schools in Sri Lanka
Provincial schools in Sri Lanka
Schools in Trincomalee
Educational institutions established in 1823